Daqiao is a town of in southwestern Guangdong province, China, located along China National Highway 207 and  (as the crow flies) from downtown Huazhou, which administers it. , it has one residential community and 13 villages under its administration.

References

See also 
 List of township-level divisions of Guangdong

Towns in Guangdong
Huazhou, Guangdong